It's Blitz! is the third studio album by American indie rock band Yeah Yeah Yeahs, released on March 6, 2009, by Interscope Records. It was originally set for release on April 13, 2009. However, after being leaked to the Internet on February 22, the release date was pushed forward to March 9 for the digital version and March 31 for the physical version.

The album was produced by Nick Launay, along with TV on the Radio's David Andrew Sitek. It spawned three singles: "Zero", "Heads Will Roll", and "Skeletons". It's Blitz! was nominated for Best Alternative Music Album at the 2010 Grammy Awards.

Recording
According to Nick Launay, one of the two producers, the recording of the album was unusual for being largely written and created in the studio at a time when record labels have cut back considerably on production budgets. The few songs the band did take along to the first sessions were later altered significantly. Launay described a typical session as follows:

Brian [Chase] would play lots of different drumbeats and we'd record it, chop it up and then make a groove loop out of it. Nick [Zinner] would then just jam to it, and we'd come up with an interesting rhythm part. Karen [O] would listen to that and come up with a vocal melody and then suddenly everything would fall into place.

The album sessions took place over several months in 2008, during which time there were numerous breaks "to get inspired".

Critical reception

It's Blitz! received universal acclaim from music critics. At Metacritic, which assigns a normalized rating out of 100 to reviews from mainstream publications, the album received an average score of 82, based on 36 reviews. The Guardians Caroline Sullivan commended the band's more dance-oriented sound, writing their "glittery new disco sound suits them very well. It's all cool, brittle catchiness, with a debt owed to Eat to the Beat-era Blondie". Emily Mackay of NME wrote that "It's Blitz!s heartfelt love letter to the transcendent possibilities of the dancefloor is an unexpectedly emphatic reassertion of why Yeah Yeah Yeahs are one of the most exciting bands of this decade", while Spins Charles Aaron said that it is "the alternative pop album of the decade—one that imbues The Killers' Hot Fuss and MGMT's Oracular Spectacular with a remarkable emotional depth and finesse". Theon Weber of The Village Voice said that Karen O "isn't revealed to us through the record's lyrics, which are as gnomic as ever, but through attitudes, tones, put-on sneers, and audible grins." Mojo gave it a score of four stars out of five and wrote that the band has "managed to mix the human and the electronic, the emotional and the artsy, the fashion-forward and the oddly retro."

Blender also gave the album four stars out of five and hailed it as "the sound of a band reborn with new momentum, and on an album that requires dancing, the message is clear: It doesn't matter where you came from. Just keep moving." Clash commented that the trio had achieved growth without distancing themselves from what made their name: "The album proves that they can provide epic music with personal themes, that YYYs can expand without losing what made us fall for them in the first place". Jon Pareles of The New York Times wrote that the band "grapple with separation and need, using dance beats to suggest the compulsive pleasure seeking that tries to drown out loneliness", and he commended their musical direction, stating, "The band is echoing the evolution of postpunk, from dogmatic austerity to technologically assisted". Uncuts April Long gave it a score of four stars out of five and praised its "spirit of experimentation", stating "What unifies them is a warm romanticism that runs throughout, edging out Karen's blatant eroticism of yore – even though there are more come-downs than come-ons, every song seems to glow from within".

Accolades

Commercial performance
It's Blitz! debuted at number 32 on the Billboard 200, selling 13,000 digital copies in its first week. Following its physical release, the album climbed to a new peak position of number 22 in its fourth week on the chart, selling 22,000 copies. As of October 2009, it had sold 184,000 copies in United States, according to Nielsen SoundScan. The album entered the UK Albums Chart at number nine with first-week sales of 18,054 copies.

Track listing

Personnel
Credits adapted from the liner notes of It's Blitz!

Yeah Yeah Yeahs
 Brian Chase – drums, cymbals, percussion
 Karen O – vocals
 Nick Zinner – guitars, keyboards, drum machine, bass

Additional musicians
 Stuart Bogie – tenor saxophone ; baritone saxophone 
 Eric Biondo – trumpet 
 Greg Kurstin – piano 
 Jane Scarpantoni – cello 
 Tunde Adebimpe – vocals 
 Imaad Wasif – guitar

Technical
 Nick Launay – production, recording
 David Andrew Sitek – production ; additional production ; recording 
 Dan Huron – recording
 Aaron Dembe – engineering assistance
 Alyssa Pittaluga – engineering assistance
 Atom – engineering assistance
 Charles Godfrey – engineering assistance
 Chris Coady – engineering assistance
 Chris Moore – engineering assistance
 Justin Leeah – engineering assistance
 Mike Laza – engineering assistance
 Spike Stent – mixing at Chalice Recording Studios (Los Angeles, California)
 Matty Green – mixing assistance
 Chris Kasych – mixing assistance
 Ted Jensen – mastering at Sterling Sound (New York City)

Artwork
 Karen O – art direction
 Seb Marling – art direction
 Urs Fischer – art direction, cover photography, inside photography
 Autumn de Wilde – live photography (band)
 David Belisle – live photography (Karen and Brian)
 Eric Uhlir – live photography (Nick)

Charts

Weekly charts

Year-end charts

Certifications

Release history

References

2009 albums
Albums produced by Dave Sitek
Albums produced by Nick Launay
Albums recorded at Long View Farm
Albums recorded at Sonic Ranch
DGC Records albums
Interscope Records albums
Polydor Records albums
Yeah Yeah Yeahs albums